Agonis baxteri is a species of flowering plant in the family Myrtaceae and is endemic to the southwest of Western Australia. It is an erect, sometimes bushy shrub with elliptic to egg-shaped leaves with the narrower end towards the base, and usually white flowers with 23 to 32 stamens.

Description
The species is superficially similar to Taxandria marginata.

Taxonomy
In 1867, George Bentham described Melaleuca baxteri in Flora Australiensis from specimens collected by William Baxter at "King George's Sound or to the eastward". In 2007, Judy Wheeler and Neville Marchant changed the name to Agonis baxteri in the journal Nuytsia. The specific epithet (baxteri) honours the collector of the type specimens.

Distribution and habitat
Agonis baxteri is found on sandplains, dunes, swamps, stony hills, disturbed and disturbed areas along the south coast in the Goldfields-Esperance region of Western Australia in the Esperance Plains and Mallee IBRA bioregions where it grows in sand and loam over quartzite, limestone or granite.

Conservation status
This species is classified as "not threatened" by the Western Australian Government Department of Biodiversity, Conservation and Attractions.

References

baxteri
Endemic flora of Southwest Australia
Plants described in 1867
Taxa named by George Bentham